The SNCF Class X 2200 diesel multiple units were built by ANF between 1985–1988.

Limoges units are used in Limousin, the Dordogne, around Bourdeaux and the line between Limoges and Angoulême, often with trailers. Nice based units are used mainly on the Nice - Cuneo line.

X 02200
X 02200
X 02200